Fingerprint Records is an independent record label formed in 1990 by Mark Heard, Dan Russell, and Chuck Long. The label released Heard's albums and albums by The Call, Vigilantes of Love, Ramona Silver, bob., and two tribute albums to Heard after his death in 1992. Heard also owned a studio, which he called Fingerprint Recorders.

Selected discography
 Mark Heard - Dry Bones Dance (1990)
 Vigilantes of Love - Jugular (1990)
 Mark Heard - Second Hand (1991)
 Mark Heard - Satellite Sky (1992)
 Vigilantes of Love - Killing Floor (1992)
 Mark Heard - High Noon (1993)
 Various Artists - Strong Hand of Love: A Tribute to Mark Heard (1994)
 bob. - Tales from the House of the Wholly Bobble (1995)
 Ramona Silver - You and Me and Hell (1995)
 Ramona Silver - Trailers (1996)
 Ramona Silver - Ultrasound (1998)
 Ramona Silver - Death By Candy (2001)
 Various Artists - Orphans of God Tribute to Mark Heard (1996)
 The Call - To Heaven and Back (1997)
 The Call - The Best of The Call (1997)
 Mark Heard - On Turning to Dust Limited edition CD reissue (1998)
 Mark Heard / Infinity Plus Three - Setting Yesterday Free Limited edition CD reissue (1998)
 Mark Heard - Mystery Mind (2000)

See also
 List of record labels

Record labels established in 1990
American independent record labels
Rock record labels